Cystodictya is an extinct genus of prehistoric bryozoans in the extinct family Cystodictyonidae.

The species C. elegans is from the Pennsylvanian (Upper Carboniferous) of the Johns Valley Formation of Oklahoma.

See also 
 List of prehistoric bryozoan genera

References

External links 

 
 

Cystoporida
Prehistoric bryozoan genera
Stenolaemata genera
Extinct bryozoans